George Nathan "Kid" Speer (June 16, 1886 – January 13, 1946) was a Major League Baseball pitcher. In 12 career games, he had a 4–4 record with a 2.83 ERA. He batted and threw left-handed.

Speer was born in Corning, Missouri, and died in Edmonton, Alberta.

External links

1886 births
1946 deaths
Detroit Tigers players
Major League Baseball pitchers
Baseball players from Missouri
Minor league baseball managers
Denison Railroaders players
Springfield Highlanders players
Leavenworth Orioles players
Leavenworth Soldiers players
Wichita Jobbers players
Buffalo Bisons (minor league) players
Birmingham Barons players
Fort Worth Panthers players
Shreveport Gassers players
Beaumont Oilers players